Mecidea is a genus of narrow stink bugs in the family Pentatomidae. There are about eight described species in Mecidea.

Species
These eight species belong to the genus Mecidea:
 Mecidea indica Dallas, 1851
 Mecidea lindbergi Wagner, 1954
 Mecidea lutzi Sailer
 Mecidea major Sailer, 1952
 Mecidea minor Ruckes, 1946
 Mecidea pallida Stal, 1845
 Mecidea pallidissima Jensen-Haarup, 1922
 Mecidea pampeana Sailer

References

Further reading

External links

 

Pentatomidae genera
Articles created by Qbugbot
Mecideini